The City of Brisbane is a local government area (LGA) which comprises the inner portion of the metropolitan area of Brisbane, the capital of Queensland, Australia. Its governing body is the Brisbane City Council. Unlike LGAs in the other mainland state capitals (Sydney, Melbourne, Perth and Adelaide), which are generally responsible only for the central business districts and inner neighbourhoods of those cities, the City of Brisbane administers a significant portion of the Brisbane metropolitan area, serving almost half of the population of the Brisbane Greater Capital City Statistical Area (GCCSA).  As such, it has a larger population than any other local government area in Australia. The City of Brisbane was the first Australian LGA to reach a population of more than one million. Its population is roughly equivalent to the populations of Tasmania, the Australian Capital Territory and the Northern Territory combined. In 2016–2017, the council administered a budget of over $3 billion, by far the largest budget of any LGA in Australia. The City of Brisbane is the world's 3rd-largest city council by area after New York and Los Angeles. 

The City derives from cities, towns and shires that merged in 1925. The main offices and central library of the council are at 266 George Street, also known as Brisbane Square. Brisbane City Hall houses the Council Chamber, the offices of the Lord Mayor and Deputy Mayor, meeting and reception rooms and the Museum of Brisbane.

Wards

, the twenty-six wards, their councillors and their party affiliations were:

Suburbs
The City of Brisbane includes the following settlements:

Inner suburbs

 Bardon
 Bowen Hills
 Brisbane CBD
 East Brisbane
 Fortitude Valley
 Herston
 Highgate Hill
 Kangaroo Point
 Kelvin Grove
 New Farm
 Newstead
 Paddington
 Petrie Terrace
 Red Hill
 South Brisbane
 Spring Hill
 Teneriffe
 West End
 Woolloongabba

Total: 19

Northern suburbs

 Albion
 Alderley
 Ascot
 Aspley
 Bald Hills
 Banyo
 Boondall
 Bracken Ridge
 Bridgeman Downs
 Brighton
 Brisbane Airport
 Carseldine
 Chermside
 Chermside West
 Clayfield
 Deagon
 Eagle Farm
 Everton Park
 Ferny Grove
 Fitzgibbon
 Gaythorne
 Geebung
 Gordon Park
 Grange
 Hamilton
 Hendra
 Kalinga
 Kedron
 Keperra
 Lutwyche
 McDowall
 Mitchelton
 Myrtletown
 Newmarket
 Northgate
 Nudgee
 Nudgee Beach
 Nundah
 Pinkenba
 Sandgate
 Shorncliffe
 Stafford
 Stafford Heights
 Taigum
 Virginia
 Wavell Heights
 Wilston
 Windsor
 Wooloowin
 Zillmere

Total: 50

Southern suburbs

 Acacia Ridge
 Algester
 Annerley
 Archerfield
 Burbank
 Calamvale
 Coopers Plains
 Darra
 Doolandella
 Drewvale
 Durack
 Dutton Park
 Eight Mile Plains
 Ellen Grove
 Fairfield
 Forest Lake
 Greenslopes
 Heathwood
 Holland Park
 Holland Park West
 Inala
 Karawatha
 Kuraby
 Larapinta
 MacGregor
 Mackenzie
 Mansfield
 Moorooka
 Mount Gravatt
 Mount Gravatt East
 Nathan
 Pallara
 Parkinson
 Richlands
 Robertson
 Rochedale
 Rocklea
 Runcorn
 Salisbury
 Seventeen Mile Rocks
 Sinnamon Park
 Stones Corner
 Stretton
 Sumner
 Sunnybank
 Sunnybank Hills
 Tarragindi
 Tennyson
 Upper Mount Gravatt
 Wacol
 Willawong
 Wishart
 Yeerongpilly
 Yeronga

Total: 54

Eastern suburbs

 Balmoral
 Belmont
 Bulimba
 Camp Hill
 Cannon Hill
 Carina
 Carina Heights
 Carindale
 Chandler
 Coorparoo
 Gumdale
 Hawthorne
 Hemmant
 Lota
 Lytton
 Manly
 Manly West
 Morningside
 Murarrie
 Norman Park
 Port of Brisbane
 Ransome
 Seven Hills
 Tingalpa
 Wakerley
 Wynnum
 Wynnum West

Total: 27

Western suburbs

 Anstead
 Ashgrove
 Auchenflower
 Banks Creek
 Bellbowrie
 Brookfield
 Chapel Hill
 Chelmer
 Chuwar
 Corinda
 England Creek
 Enoggera
 Enoggera Reservoir
 Ferny Grove
 Fig Tree Pocket
 Graceville
 Indooroopilly
 Jamboree Heights
 Jindalee
 Karana Downs
 Kenmore
 Kenmore Hills
 Kholo
 Lake Manchester
 Middle Park
 Milton
 Moggill
 Mount Coot-tha
 Mount Crosby
 Mount Ommaney
 Oxley
 Pinjarra Hills
 Pullenvale
 Riverhills
 Sherwood
 Sinnamon Park
 St Lucia
 Taringa
 The Gap
 Toowong
 Upper Brookfield
 Upper Kedron
 Westlake

Total: 43

Moreton Bay

 Bulwer
 Cowan Cowan
 Kooringal
 Moreton Bay
 Moreton Island

Total: 5

History

The Government of Queensland created the City of Brisbane with a view to uniting the then Brisbane metropolitan area under a single planning and governance structure. The City of Brisbane Act 1924 received assent from the Governor on 30 October 1924. On 1 October 1925, 20 local government areas of various sizes were abolished and merged into the new city, namely:

Cities:
 Brisbane
 South Brisbane
Towns:
 Hamilton
 Ithaca
 Sandgate
 Toowong
 Windsor
 Wynnum
Shires:
 Balmoral
 Belmont
 Coorparoo
 Enoggera
 Kedron
 Moggill
 Sherwood
 Stephens
 Taringa
 Tingalpa
 Toombul
 Yeerongpilly

The council also assumed responsibility for several quasi-autonomous government authorities, such as the Brisbane Tramways Trust.

Demographics

Heritage 
The Brisbane City Council maintains the Brisbane Local Heritage Register, a list of nominated sites that satisfy the council's heritage criteria.

Governance

The City of Brisbane is governed by the Brisbane City Council, the largest local council in Australia. The Brisbane City Council has its power divided between a Lord Mayor, a parliamentary-style council of twenty-six councillors representing single-member wards of approximately 30,000 voters (roughly equivalent in size to state electorates), and a Civic Cabinet comprising the Lord Mayor, the Deputy Mayor (drawn from the majority on Council) and the chairpersons of the seven standing committees drawn from the membership of Council. Due to the City of Brisbane's status as the country's largest LGA, the Lord Mayor is elected by the largest single-member electorate in Australia.  Like all mayors in Queensland, the Lord Mayor is vested with very broad executive power.

The Brisbane City Council operates under the City of Brisbane Act 2010, while other local governments in Queensland are governed by the Local Government Act 2009. Council meetings are held at Level 2, City Hall, 64 Adelaide Street, Brisbane City every Tuesday at 2pm except during recess and holiday periods. This temporary venue is in use due to the restoration work being performed on the traditional venue Brisbane City Hall. Council Meetings generally open to the public, excluding the Civic Cabinet.

Heraldry

The motto of the City of Brisbane is Meliora sequimur, Latin for We aim for better things. The council's corporate slogan is Dedicated to a better Brisbane. The city's colours are blue and gold. Its corporate logo was introduced in 1982 in preparation for the Commonwealth Games hosted in Brisbane that year. It features a stylised version of Brisbane's City Hall which opened in 1930. The city's floral emblem is the (exotic) poinsettia and its faunal emblem is the graceful tree frog.

Amenities 
Brisbane City Council operate libraries in Annerley, Ashgrove, Banyo, Bracken Ridge, Brisbane CBD (Brisbane Square), Bulimba, Carina, Carindale (Westfield Carindale), Chermside, Coopers Plains, Corinda, Everton Park, Fairfield, Upper Mount Gravatt (Garden City), Grange, Hamilton, Holland Park, Inala, Indooroopilly, Kenmore, Mitchelton, Mount Coot-tha (Botanic Gardens), Mount Gravatt, Mount Ommaney, New Farm, Nundah, Sandgate, Stones Corner, Sunnybank Hills, Toowong, West End, Wynnum, and Zillmere. In addition, it operates a mobile library service to Aspley, Bellbowrie, Brighton, Ellen Grove, Forest Lake, Manly West, Mount Crosby and The Gap. There is also a pop-up library that attends community events and festivals, as well as visiting various parks around Brisbane for children's storytime sessions (a list of dates and places is published some months in advance).

Sister cities
The City of Brisbane's sister cities are:

 Abu Dhabi, United Arab Emirates (2009)
 Auckland, New Zealand (1988)
 Chongqing, China (2005)
 Daejeon, South Korea (2002)
 Hyderabad, India (2010)
 Kaohsiung, Taiwan (1997)
 Kobe, Japan (1985)
 Semarang, Indonesia (1993)
 Shenzhen, China (1992)

Nice, France was formerly a sister city of Brisbane until the relationship was severed in 1995 as protest against the Chirac government's decision to resume nuclear testing in the Pacific Ocean. Bangkok became a sister city of Brisbane in 1997, but the partnership ended in 2017 at the latest.

See also

 Lord Mayor of Brisbane
List of mayors and lord mayors of Brisbane
 Local government in Australia

Notes

References

External links

Brisbane City Council's Organisational Structure
 
 Google map of pre 1925 merger Brisbane Councils

 
Local government areas in Brisbane
Local government areas of Queensland
1925 establishments in Australia